Fuzzy is the debut studio album by American rock band Grant Lee Buffalo, released in 1993 by Slash Records. According to the band's website, "Fuzzy would galvanize the sound of Grant Lee Buffalo, i.e., the acoustic feedback howl of overdriven 12-string guitars, melodic distorto-bass, tribal drum bombast, the old world churn of pump organs and parlor pianos."

R.E.M.'s Michael Stipe praised Fuzzy as "the best album of the year hands down".

Track listing

Personnel
 Grant Lee Phillips – electric and acoustic guitars, vocals
 Paul Kimble – bass, vocals, piano, keyboards
 Joey Peters – drums, percussion

Charts

References

External links
Grant Lee Buffalo official website album page
[ Allmusic album main page]
MP3.com album main page

1993 debut albums
Grant Lee Buffalo albums